Clödie are a Polish rock band formed in Częstochowa in 2012. The band currently consists of lead vocalist Klaudia Trzepizur, guitarist Olaf Olszewski, bassist Jacek Czekaj, keyboardist Krzysztof Mrzygłód, and drummer Mateusz Królica. In 2018, they went viral on YouTube for covering "Zombie" by The Cranberries, reaching over 30 million views.

History 
Clödie was formed by Klaudia Trzepizur in 2012. Trzepizur started by covering popular songs on her YouTube channel. Prior to starting Clödie, she was the lead vocalist in the local band Latent Effect. In 2013, Trzepizur participated on the fifth season of Polish talent show Tylko Muzyka. In 2014, Klaudia gained public attention after her participation on the fourth season of The Voice of Poland. She performed "It's a Heartache" by Bonnie Tyler, which instantly earned her the nickname "Polish Bonnie Tyler".   

The band first came into attention after the release of their first English single "Go!" in 2018. The song was also submitted to Polish broadcaster Telewizja Polska in hope of representing the country at the Eurovision Song Contest 2018. In July 2018, the band released a cover version of "Zombie" by The Cranberries, which became their major breakthrough. The cover went viral on YouTube with over 25 million views. The popularity gave Clödie the opportunity to collaborate with international songwriters and producers, opening several doors to the band. Once again, the band tried to represent Poland at the Eurovision Song Contest 2019, with their newest release "Devil in Disguise", which also gained a lot of media attention and helped the band get heard outside of Poland. On 11 August, the band released the single "Zapomnijmy", which one month later was followed by its English version "Fire Burns Within". An annual tradition the band holds is releasing a Christmas single, which besides the cover of "Christmas Time" by Bryan Adams, have all been in Polish. With the release of "Świąteczny czas" in 2019, it also marked the bands first single released in their native tongue to chart.

Clödie made the release of covers a tradition and released an acoustic rendition of "Dreamer" by Ozzy Osbourne on 5 April 2020. The band released their ninth Polish single "Gniew" on 26 April. To hype upon the release of their upcoming original new single, they released a cover version of "What About Us" by Pink. On 7 October, they released a cover version of "Radioactive" by Imagine Dragons. On 31 October, the band released a cover for "Sweet Child o' Mine" by Guns N' Roses. During Polish Independence Day on 11 November, they released a cover version of the song "Arahja" by Kult. Continuing the bands tradition of releasing Christmas music, they announced the release of Brenda Lee's "Rockin' Around the Christmas Tree" accompanied with a music video.

Musical style 
Clödie's sound can be described as 1980's rock music with a pinch of modernity. By combining the past with the present, the band combines their love for 1980's rock music with the emotions and existence in the now.

Band members 

 Klaudia Trzepizur – vocals (2012–present)
 Olaf Olszewski – guitar (2015–present)
 Krzysztof Mrzygłód – keyboards (2017–present)
 Jacek Czekaj – bass guitar (2018–present)
 Mateusz Królica – drums (2018–present)

Discography

Extended plays 

 2020: Memories

Singles

Music videos 

 2014: "Kobieta"
 2015: "Uwierz w siebie"
 2015: "Barykady"
 2016: "Zostawiam wszystko"
 2016: "Meluzyna" (Małgorzata Ostrowska cover)
 2017: "Święta, ach Święta"
 2018: "Go!"
 2018: "Zombie" (The Cranberries cover)
 2019: "Devil in Disguise"
 2019: "Zapomnijmy"
 2019: "Let Me Go"
 2019: "Świąteczny czas"
 2020: "Let Me Go" (acoustic version)
 2020: "Dreamer" (Ozzy Osbourne cover)
 2020: "Gniew"
 2020: "Against the World"
 2020: "Radioactive" (Imagine Dragons cover)
 2020: "Sweet Child o' Mine" (Guns N' Roses cover)
 2020: "Arahja" (Kult cover)
 2020: "Rockin' Around the Christmas Tree" (Brenda Lee cover)
 2021: "What About Us" (Pink cover)
 2021: "Sins"
 2021: "You Are the One"
 2021: "Coraz Więcej Chcę"
 2021: "Hold On"
 2021: "Santa Claus Is Back in Town" (Elvis Presley cover)
 2022: "Hold On" (80's Live Version)

References 

Polish rock music groups
2012 establishments in Poland